Niko Price (born September 29, 1989) is an American mixed martial artist currently fighting in the Welterweight division of the Ultimate Fighting Championship.

Background
Born and raised in Cape Coral, Florida, Price attended Mariner High School where he played linebacker for the school's football team. Upon graduating, Price began training in kickboxing, winning two bouts both via knockout. Price briefly went to college, studying criminal justice. He started training mixed martial arts in 2008.

Mixed martial arts career

Early career
After going undefeated (9–0) as an amateur, Price made his professional MMA debut in February 2012. Before joining the UFC Price amassed a record of 8–0 with 7 of his 8 wins coming by stoppages.

Ultimate Fighting Championship
Price made his promotional debut for the UFC at UFC 207 against Brandon Thatch. He won the fight via submission in the first round.

Price next fight came at UFC Fight Night: Bermudez vs. The Korean Zombie against Alex Morono. He won the fight via knockout in the second round; however, this was later overturned to a no contest after he tested positive for marijuana.

Price next faced Alan Jouban at UFC Fight Night: Pettis vs. Moreno on August 5, 2017. He won the fight via TKO in round one. The win also earned Price his first Performance of the Night bonus award.

Price was to face Luan Chagas on October 28, 2017 at UFC Fight Night: Brunson vs. Machida. On October 6, it was announced that Chagas had pulled out of the bout due to a fractured foot and was replaced by Vicente Luque. Price lost the fight via D'Arce variation of the brabo in Brazil or D’Arce choke submission after a combination of strikes had him appearing out on his feet in round two.

Price faced George Sullivan January 27, 2018 at UFC on Fox: Jacaré vs. Brunson 2. He won the fight by rear-naked choke submission in the second round.

Price was expected to face Belal Muhammad on June 1, 2018 at UFC Fight Night 131. However, Price was removed from the bout on May 22 for undisclosed reasons and replaced by promotional newcomer Chance Rencountre.

Price faced Randy Brown on July 14, 2018 at UFC Fight Night 133. He won the fight via knockout in the second round after landing several hammerfists from the bottom to knock Brown out. This win earned him the Performance of the Night award.

Price faced Abdul Razak Alhassan on September 8, 2018 at UFC 228. He lost the fight via knockout in the first round.

Price faced Tim Means on March 9, 2019 at UFC on ESPN+ 4. He won via knockout in the first round, becoming the first man to finish Means by knockout in MMA competition. This win earned him the Performance of the Night award.

Price faced Geoff Neal on July 27, 2019 at UFC 240. He lost the fight via technical knockout in round two.

Price faced James Vick on October 12, 2019 at UFC on ESPN+ 19. He won the fight via knockout in round one after landing an upkick from the bottom to knock Vick out.  This win earned him the Performance of the Night bonus award.

Price was expected to face Muslim Salikhov on April 11, 2020 at UFC Fight Night: Overeem vs. Harris. Due to the COVID-19 pandemic, the event was eventually postponed.

On March 21, 2020, Price announced that he had signed a new, four-fight contract with the UFC.

Price was scheduled to face Vicente Luque in a rematch on April 18, 2020 at UFC 249. However, on April 9, Dana White, the president of UFC announced that this event was postponed and the bout eventually took place on May 9, 2020. He lost the fight via technical knockout due to doctor stoppage in round three.

Price faced Donald Cerrone on September 19, 2020 at UFC Fight Night 178. The fight was declared a majority draw. On November 4, it was announced that the Nevada State Athletic Commission (NSAC) issued a temporary suspension for Price, after he tested positive for carboxy THC in a drug test related to his fight. On December 2, 2020, it was announced that the bout was overturned to no contest and Price was suspended for six months and fined $8,500.

Price faced Michel Pereira on July 10, 2021 at UFC 264. He lost the fight via unanimous decision.

As the first bout of his new four-fight contract, Price faced Alex Oliveira on October 2, 2021 at UFC Fight Night 192. He won the fight via unanimous decision.

Price faced Philip Rowe on  December 3, 2022, at UFC on ESPN 42. After knocking Rowe down in the earlier rounds, Price lost the bout via TKO stoppage in the third.

Personal life
Niko and his wife Erica have six children.

Championships and accomplishments
Ultimate Fighting Championship
Performance of the Night (Four times) vs. Alan Jouban, Randy Brown, Tim Means and James Vick
MMAJunkie.com
October 2019 Knockout of the Month vs. James Vick
 2020 May Fight of the Month vs. Vicente Luque

Mixed martial arts record

|-
|Loss
|align=center|15–6 (2)
|Philip Rowe
|TKO (punches)
|UFC on ESPN: Thompson vs. Holland
|
|align=center|3
|align=center|3:26
|Orlando, Florida, United States
|
|-
|Win
|align=center|15–5 (2)
|Alex Oliveira
|Decision (unanimous)
|UFC Fight Night: Santos vs. Walker
|
|align=center|3
|align=center|5:00
|Las Vegas, Nevada, United States
|
|-
|Loss
|align=center|14–5 (2)
|Michel Pereira
|Decision (unanimous)
|UFC 264
|
|align=center|3
|align=center|5:00
|Las Vegas, Nevada, United States
|
|-
|NC
|align=center|14–4 (2)
|Donald Cerrone
|NC (overturned)
|UFC Fight Night: Covington vs. Woodley
|
|align=center|3
|align=center|5:00
|Las Vegas, Nevada, United States
|
|-
|Loss
|align=center|14–4 (1)
|Vicente Luque
|TKO (doctor stoppage)
|UFC 249
|
|align=center|3
|align=center|3:37
|Jacksonville, Florida, United States
|
|-
|Win
|align=center|14–3 (1)
|James Vick
|KO (upkick)
|UFC Fight Night: Joanna vs. Waterson
|
|align=center|1
|align=center|1:44
|Tampa, Florida, United States
|
|- 
|Loss
|align=center|13–3 (1)
|Geoff Neal
|TKO (punches)
|UFC 240
|
|align=center|2
|align=center|2:39
|Edmonton, Alberta, Canada
|
|-
|Win
|align=center|13–2 (1)
|Tim Means
|KO (punches)
|UFC Fight Night: Lewis vs. dos Santos
|
|align=center|1
|align=center|4:50
|Wichita, Kansas, United States
|
|-
|Loss
|align=center|12–2 (1)
|Abdul Razak Alhassan
|KO (punch)
|UFC 228
|
|align=center|1
|align=center|0:43
|Dallas, Texas, United States
|
|-
|Win
|align=center|12–1 (1)
|Randy Brown
|KO (punches)
|UFC Fight Night: dos Santos vs. Ivanov
|
|align=center|2
|align=center|1:09
|Boise, Idaho, United States
|
|-
|Win
|align=center|11–1 (1)
|George Sullivan
|Submission (rear-naked choke)
|UFC on Fox: Jacaré vs. Brunson 2
|
|align=center|2
|align=center|4:21
|Charlotte, North Carolina, United States
|
|-
|Loss
|align=center|10–1 (1)
|Vicente Luque
|Submission (D’Arce choke)
|UFC Fight Night: Brunson vs. Machida
|
|align=center|2
|align=center|4:08
|São Paulo, Brazil
|
|-
|Win
|align=center|10–0 (1)
|Alan Jouban
|TKO (punches)
|UFC Fight Night: Pettis vs. Moreno
|
|align=center|1
|align=center|1:44
|Mexico City, Mexico
|
|-
|NC
|align=center|9–0 (1)
|Alex Morono
|NC (overturned)
|UFC Fight Night: Bermudez vs. The Korean Zombie
|
|align=center|2
|align=center|5:00
|Houston, Texas, United States
|
|-
|Win
|align=center|9–0
|Brandon Thatch
|Submission (arm-triangle choke)
|UFC 207
|
|align=center|1
|align=center|4:30
|Las Vegas, Nevada, United States
|
|-
|Win
|align=center|8–0
|Willie Hosch
|Decision (unanimous)
|Fight Time 32
|
|align=center|3
|align=center|5:00
|Fort Lauderdale, Florida, United States
|
|-
|Win
|align=center|7–0
|Jose Caceres
|TKO (punches)
|Fight Time 30
|
|align=center|1
|align=center|1:31
|Fort Lauderdale, Florida, United States
|
|-
|Win
|align=center|6–0
|Maurice Salmon
|TKO (punches)
|Fight Time 26
|
|align=center|1
|align=center|2:38
|Fort Lauderdale, Florida, United States
|
|-
|Win
|align=center|5–0
|Michael Lilly
|TKO (punches)
|Fight Time 23
|
|align=center|2
|align=center|1:05
|Miami, Florida, United States
|
|-
|Win
|align=center|4–0
|Danilo Padilha Da Silva
|TKO (punches)
|Fight Time 21
|
|align=center|1
|align=center|0:22
|Fort Lauderdale, Florida, United States
|
|-
|Win
|align=center|3–0
|David Hayes
|TKO (punches)
|Fight Time 20
|
|align=center|1
|align=center|3:07
|Fort Lauderdale, Florida, United States
|
|-
|Win
|align=center|2–0
|Mikerson Lindor
|TKO (punches)
|Fight Time 19
|
|align=center|1
|align=center|4:59
|Fort Lauderdale, Florida, United States
|
|-
|Win
|align=center|1–0
|Alejandro Gomez
|Submission (armbar)
|Fight Time 8
|
|align=center|1
|align=center|2:49
|Fort Lauderdale, Florida, United States
|

See also
 List of current UFC fighters
 List of male mixed martial artists

References

External links
 

American male mixed martial artists
1989 births
Living people
People from Cape Canaveral, Florida
Welterweight mixed martial artists
Mixed martial artists utilizing Brazilian jiu-jitsu
Mixed martial artists from Florida
Ultimate Fighting Championship male fighters
American practitioners of Brazilian jiu-jitsu